Venczel is a surname. Notable people with the surname include:

 (born 1913), Hungarian sociologist, researcher, and writer
Vera Venczel (born 1946), Hungarian actress
Balázs Venczel (born 1986), Hungarian footballer

See also
 Wenzel
 Wenczel